Justice Lea may refer to:

Benjamin J. Lea, associate justice of the Tennessee Supreme Court
James Neilson Lea, associate justice of the Louisiana Supreme Court

See also
Justice Lee (disambiguation)